Pat or Patrick Delaney may refer to:

 Pat Delaney (actor), actress in Cos
 Pat Delaney (footballer) (born 1940), Scottish footballer
 Pat Delaney (Kilkenny hurler) (1942–2013), Irish hurler
 Pat Delaney (Offaly hurler) (born 1954), Irish hurler
 Pat Delany (born 1969), American politician

See also
 Patrick Delany (disambiguation)